State Route 503 (SR 503) is a north–south state highway in the southwestern quadrant of the U.S. state of Ohio.  The southern terminus of SR 503 is at U.S. Route 127 (US 127) in Seven Mile.  Its northern terminus is at a T-intersection with SR 121 on the eastern limits of the village of Wayne Lakes.

Route description

Along its way, SR 503 travels through northern Butler County, eastern Preble County and southern Darke County.  There are no segments of SR 503 that are included as a part of the National Highway System, a network of highways identified as being most important for the economy, mobility and defense of the nation.

History
The SR 503 designation was assigned in 1937.  The highway was established along the routing that it maintains to this day between US 127 in Seven Mile and SR 121 in Wayne Lakes.  No changes of major significance have taken place to the routing of the highway since its inception.

Major intersections

References

503
Transportation in Butler County, Ohio
Transportation in Preble County, Ohio
Transportation in Darke County, Ohio